Thomas Howard Kean (born April 21, 1935) is an American businessman, academic administrator and politician. A member of the Republican Party, Kean served as the 48th governor of New Jersey from 1982 to 1990. Following his tenure as governor, Kean served as the president of Drew University for 15 years, retiring in 2005.

In 2002, Kean was appointed by President George W. Bush to serve as chairman of the National Commission on Terrorist Attacks Upon the United States, widely known as the 9/11 Commission. In this position, Kean led the commission's investigation into the causes of the September 11 attacks in order to provide recommendations to prevent future terrorist attacks. Kean is the father of U.S. Representative Thomas Kean Jr.

Early life and education
Kean was born in New York City to a long line of New Jersey politicians and family of Dutch Americans. His mother was Elizabeth (née Howard) and his father, Robert Kean, was a U.S. Representative. His grandfather Hamilton Fish Kean and great-uncle John Kean both served as U.S. Senators. His second great-uncle was Hamilton Fish, a U.S. Senator, Governor of New York, and the 26th U.S. Secretary of State. Kean's relative, William Livingston, was a delegate to the Continental Congress and the first Governor of New Jersey. His mother is also of partial Irish descent as a descendant of John Neilson.

Kean was initially educated at The Potomac School in McLean, Virginia. When he reached the fourth grade, he entered St. Albans School. In 1946, at the age of eleven, his parents then enrolled him at St. Mark's School in Southborough, Massachusetts, the alma mater of his father and two older brothers.

After graduating from St. Mark's, he attended Princeton University and graduated with a B.A. in history in 1957 after completing a senior thesis titled "Niemcewicz (The Biography of a Polish Patriot, 1756-1842, Including His Impressions of America, 1797-1807)." While at Princeton, Kean participated in the American Whig-Cliosophic Society. After working on his father's unsuccessful senatorial campaign, and as a history teacher for three years at St. Mark's School, Kean attended Teachers College, Columbia University in New York City and earned his M.A. in history.

Kean met Deborah Bye at a party in Manhattan and the couple began dating in October 1966. Bye and Kean married at the Old Drawyers Church in Odessa, Delaware, on June 3, 1967. Kean was a longtime resident of Livingston, New Jersey, where he moved to in 1967 during his first campaign for office.

New Jersey political career

Originally a teacher of history and government, Kean was elected, in 1967, as a moderate Republican to the New Jersey General Assembly. He ran with Philip Kaltenbacher, a Short Hills Republican who had served as an aide to Assemblyman Irwin Kimmelman in 1964 through 1966. (Kimmelman would later serve as Attorney General in Kean's administration.) In the Republican primary, Kean and Kaltenbacher defeated Donald Fitz Maurice, Vivian Tompkins Lange, the sister of former U.S. Attorney William F. Tompkins, and Joseph Shanahan.

At the start of the Assembly session in 1972, Democratic leadership had wanted to name S. Howard Woodson of Trenton as Speaker, until Assemblyman David Friedland made a deal as one of four Democrats who voted to give the minority Republicans control of the General Assembly, electing Kean as Assembly Speaker. Woodson would have been the Assembly's first African American Speaker, and charges of racism were leveled by fellow Democrats against Friedland. In the next Assembly, in 1974, the Democrats united behind Woodson for Speaker; Kean then became the minority leader of the Assembly. In 1973, he briefly served as acting New Jersey governor. In 1974, Kean ran for New Jersey's 5th congressional district, but lost the Republican primary to Millicent Fenwick by 0.32%.

During the 1976 presidential campaign, Kean served as Gerald Ford's campaign manager for the state of New Jersey.

1977 gubernatorial loss and aftermath
In 1977, Kean ran unsuccessfully for the Republican nomination for the governor of New Jersey. Although he spent most of his career as a political moderate, in this race Kean ran to the right of New Jersey Senate Minority Leader Raymond Bateman. Kean was unable to obtain the endorsement of many county Republican chairmen, or Gerald Ford, despite having served as his campaign director for the state of New Jersey the previous year.  Bateman defeated Kean and won the nomination, though Bateman went on to lose the general election to Brendan Byrne.

After the election, Governor Byrne appointed Kean as a commissioner on the board of the New Jersey Highway Authority. Kean also worked as a political commentator on New Jersey public television.

1981 gubernatorial victory and 1985 re-election

Kean fared better four years later, in 1981, when he again ran for governor. Kean made campaign promises to foster job creation, clean up toxic waste sites, reduce crime, and to preserve home rule. He also received the endorsement of Gerald Ford his second time running for governor.

Kean defeated Democratic Representative Jim Florio in the closest election in New Jersey gubernatorial election history; Kean won by 1,797 votes. The election was controversial due to the involvement of the Republican National Committee, who appointed a Ballot Security Task Force that allegedly intimidated voters. One of his strategists for the Kean campaign in 1981 was Roger J. Stone, a self-proclaimed "GOP hitman."

Kean proved hugely popular in office. In striking contrast to his slim 1981 victory, he won re-election in 1985 with the largest margin of victory ever recorded for a gubernatorial race in New Jersey, defeating Peter Shapiro, then Essex County Executive, 70%–29%. Kean won every municipality in the state except Audubon Park and Chesilhurst in Camden County and Roosevelt in Monmouth County.  His coattails were long enough for the Republicans to take control of the General Assembly, flipping it from a 44–36 Democratic majority to a 50–30 Republican majority.

1988 Republican Convention speech
In 1988, reflecting his stature as an up-and-coming leader of the Republican Party's moderate wing, Kean delivered the keynote speech at the 1988 Republican National Convention in New Orleans. The same year, he also authored a book, The Politics of Inclusion, published by Free Press, which urged political cooperation among historically divided interest groups and politicians.

Gubernatorial legacy

Limited to two consecutive terms as governor by the New Jersey State Constitution, Kean left office in January 1990 as one of the most popular political figures in New Jersey political history. Former New Jersey gubernatorial candidate Doug Forrester, New Jersey Congressman Bob Franks, and other leading New Jersey and national Republican figures began their political and public policy careers in his state administration. He was succeeded by James Florio, who won a landslide victory in November 1989.

In the aftermath of Governor Kean's gubernatorial tenure, the Eagleton Institute of Politics at Rutgers University New Brunswick's  Center on the American Governor, established the Thomas H. Kean Archive.

While governor, Kean served on the President's Education Policy Advisory Committee and chaired the Education Commission of the States and the National Governor's Association Task Force on Teaching."

Kean gained a degree of national recognition as the spokesperson for a New Jersey tourism commercial, in which he recited the state's tourism motto: "New Jersey and You: Perfect Together." The campaign, which was revived in 1998 by Governor Christine Todd Whitman, capped a long-term, multibillion-dollar effort to restore New Jersey's shoreline as an environmentally sustainable cornerstone in the state's tourism industry.

One unique facet of Kean's leadership was his advocacy for the arts. Leaders in the arts community praised the Governor for his work. This work culminated in the creation of the New Jersey Performing Arts Center, a highly successful cultural and entertainment center in Newark. Although its creation required roughly $200 million in funding, Kean believed that the cultural center had the power to revitalize the city, making the risk worth it. The Governor also believed that improving the city would strengthen the state as a whole.  Kean has remained involved in advocacy for the arts years after his time as governor, criticizing recent state-level funding cuts for being too quick to do away with arts spending.

Kean's inclusive practice of government remains central to his legacy. This legacy found expression in his urban policies and outreach to traditional Democratic constituencies, his aggressive divestment of public retirement funds from South Africa, embrace of Martin Luther King, Jr. Day as an opportunity to raise awareness of race on a statewide basis, and his successful primary sponsorship of the bill that established the Educational Opportunity Fund. This fund appropriated $2 million for direct student aid and support programs for low-income students who demonstrated academic capability but lack sufficient preparation for college. It continues to serve disadvantaged New Jersey students nearly 50 years later. The fund's longevity is indicative of Kean's long-term outlook and the overall strength of his legislation.

Cabinet and administration

Drew University
Following the end of his second Gubernatorial term, Kean was named President of Drew University, a small liberal arts university in Madison, New Jersey. Kean's considerable standing as a popular former governor of the state was helpful as he undertook an upgrading of the university's campus and academic programs by stressing the primacy of teaching, the creative use of technology in the liberal arts, and the importance of international education. During Kean's presidency, applications to Drew increased by more than 40 percent; the endowment nearly tripled; and more than $60 million was committed to construction of new buildings and renovation of residence halls and other older buildings. Kean was extremely popular among the student body; he would frequently eat lunch unannounced with students in the dining hall, and was a regular spectator at Drew sporting events. Kean served as Drew's president until 2005, teaching a highly selective political science seminar.

National policy leadership

Involvement beginning in 1990 
While leading Drew University, Kean also continued to expand his role as a national political leader, forging close working relationships with the administrations of George H. W. Bush, Bill Clinton (with whom he had worked closely in the National Governors Association) and George W. Bush, who saw Kean as an important national political ally.

Former Heritage Foundation foreign policy analyst Michael Johns and other national policy and political leaders were recruited by Kean to support and help administer his growing involvement in a broad range of national policy initiatives in the fields of education, environmental, low-income housing, foreign policy and other issues.  As governor, Kean had some degree of national recognition as the spokesperson for a New Jersey tourism commercial, in which he cited the state's tourism motto: "New Jersey and You: Perfect Together." With Johns' support, Kean also quickly established foreign policy and national security credentials following his governorship that ultimately proved important in his gaining appointment by President George W. Bush to head the 9/11 Commission.

Beginning in 1990, Kean for the first time began expressing views on foreign policy and national security matters, views that generally mirrored those of the Republican Party.  In a December 15, 1991, speech to The Heritage Foundation in Washington, D.C., Kean endorsed the free trade initiatives under way by the administration of then-President George H. W. Bush.  He also advocated continued U.S. aid to anti-communist resistance forces in Afghanistan, Angola, and to those engaged in supporting democratic change in the former Soviet Union.  "To those supporting the Afghan resistance," Kean told the Heritage Foundation audience in 1991, "I say, carry on."

Kean quickly was appointed to the boards of several important foreign policy bodies, including the U.S. government-funded National Endowment for Democracy (NED), which was heavily engaged in supporting democracy-building programs in former Eastern bloc and other nations around the world, and a Presidential advisory commission on a post-Castro Cuba, chaired by former U.S. Presidential Republican candidate Steve Forbes.

Several years later, in 1997, Kean was appointed as an advisory board member of President Clinton's One America Initiative. He also serves as an advisory board member for the Partnership for a Secure America.

Heading the September 11 Commission

Following the September 11, 2001 terrorist attacks on the United States by al-Qaeda, political pressure grew for an independent commission to independently investigate why the attacks were not prevented by U.S. national security organizations, including the Central Intelligence Agency, Department of Defense, National Security Agency and others, and to provide recommendations for preventing future terrorist attacks.

The commission reassembled in Washington on July 22, 2014, for the tenth anniversary of the issuance of its report. It assessed how well the government is performing given such terrorist threats and make recommendations for changes moving forward.

Kean served as a co-chair of the National Security Preparedness Group (NSPG) at the Bipartisan Policy Center.

Bush appoints Kean

Bush initially selected former Nixon's Secretary of State, Henry Kissinger to head the National Commission on Terrorist Attacks Upon the United States (9/11 Commission). But on December 13, 2002, Kissinger resigned as the commission's chairman, under pressure because of potential conflicts with his global business consultancy.

Noting Kean's post-gubernatorial foreign policy involvement and his reputation as a consensus-oriented political leader, Bush nominated Kean to succeed Kissinger in leading the important and politically sensitive Commission.  The commission is widely considered the most important independent U.S. government commission since the Warren Commission, which was charged with investigating the 1963 assassination of President John F. Kennedy, and perhaps the most important in American history given its mammoth responsibility for investigating the causes of the first foreign attack on the U.S. mainland since the War of 1812, and recommending steps to defend the U.S. from future attacks.  Kean's appointment to head the commission, and later the work and final report of the commission, drew substantial global attention.

Criticisms of Kean's 9/11 chairmanship
Just as some had criticized Kissinger's nomination, Kean's leadership of the commission also drew some criticism.  Some alleged that Kean did not have the depth of foreign policy and national security expertise needed to manage an investigation so integral to the future of American national security.  Supporters of Kean in the Bush administration and elsewhere, however, countered that Kean's work since 1990 as a board member of the National Endowment for Democracy, the post-Castro Cuba Commission and his foreign policy and national security commentary and analysis following his governorship established adequate national security and foreign policy credentials for him to assume such a critically important assignment.

Kean on bin Laden: "We had him"

In December 2003, Kean said that the September 11 attacks could have been prevented, stating: "As you read the report, you're going to have a pretty clear idea what wasn't done and what should have been done. This was not something that had to happen."

On April 4, 2004, Kean again stated that the September 11 attacks could have been prevented, saying that the United States government should have acted sooner to dismantle al-Qaeda and responded more quickly to other terrorist threats. "When we actually saw bin Laden on the ground, using the Predator or other means, did we have...actionable intelligence? Should we have sent a cruise missile into a site where he was at that point? I think those early opportunities are clear. We had him. We saw him. I think maybe we could have done something about it."

On July 22, 2004, the Commission issued its final report, the 9/11 Commission Report, which concluded that the CIA and the FBI had ill-served President Bush and the American people in failing to predict or prevent the September 11 attacks, which the report concluded was preventable.

Without Precedent
On August 15, 2006, a book by Kean and 9/11 Commission Vice Chairman Lee H. Hamilton, titled Without Precedent: The Inside Story of the 9/11 Commission, was released regarding the September 11 attacks and the September 11 Commission.

In the book, Kean and Hamilton write that the 9/11 Commission was so frustrated with repeated misstatements by The Pentagon and Federal Aviation Administration that it considered an investigation into possible deception by these government bodies concerning their response to the attacks.

ABC's The Path to 9/11
Kean served as a paid consultant and spokesman for the ABC miniseries The Path to 9/11, which aired nationally and without commercial interruption on September 10, 2006.  On September 11, the second part of the miniseries aired, also without commercial interruption, with the exception of a 20-minute break at 9 pm ET, when President Bush addressed the nation on the fifth anniversary of the September 11 attacks.

While not technically considered a documentary by ABC, prior to its airing, the series drew criticism for misrepresenting facts leading up the September 11 attacks.  Many former high-ranking Clinton administration officials, including Clinton himself, and other scholars, publicly questioned the accuracy of the miniseries and asked that it not be aired. Former secretary of state Madeleine Albright called the miniseries' portrayal of her "false and defamatory." Former U.S. Ambassador to Yemen Barbara Bodine also strongly criticized her character's portrayal, complaining in the Los Angeles Times about the "mythmakers" who created the film, calling the project "false."

July 2007 al-Qaeda video cites Kean comments on al-Qaeda's strength
On July 4, 2007, the terrorist group al-Qaeda publicly released a video, featuring its Deputy Chief Ayman al-Zawahri urging all Muslims to unite in a holy war against the U.S. in Iraq and elsewhere.  The 95-minute video was discovered and released by U.S. intelligence sources and, in addition to al-Zawahri's comments, prominently featured video excerpts of Kean citing al-Qaeda as one of the most formidable security threats that the U.S. has ever confronted, presumably with the intention of bolstering the morale of al-Qaeda supporters through Kean's citation of the magnitude of the movement's strength and threat. Comments by Kean cited on the video include a reference to the fact that al-Qaeda remains as strong in 2007 as it was before the September 11, 2001, attacks.

The video also appeared to validate that al-Qaeda was closely monitoring U.S. political developments, especially including the work of the September 11 Commission, which Kean chaired.  It also suggested that al-Qaeda intended to focus not just on engaging the West in Iraq, but also in other countries.  "As for the second half of the long-term plan," al-Zawahri says on the video, "it consists of hurrying to the fields of Jihad like Afghanistan, Iraq and Somalia for Jihadi preparation and training."

Corporate boards

Kean has served as chairman of The Robert Wood Johnson Foundation, the nation's largest health philanthropy; the National Campaign to Prevent Teen and Unplanned Pregnancy; the Carnegie Corporation of New York; Educate America; the National Environmental Education and Training Foundation; MENTOR: The National Mentoring Partnership and the Newark Alliance. He has sat on corporate boards including ARAMARK, UnitedHealth Group, Hess Corporation, Pepsi Bottling Group, CIT Group Incorporated, and Franklin Templeton Investments.

In 2006, the United States Securities and Exchange Commission began investigating the conduct of the United Health Group's management and directors.  Additionally, the Internal Revenue Service and prosecutors in the U.S. Attorney's Office for the Southern District of New York subpoenaed documents from the company.  The investigations came to light after a series of probing articles in The Wall Street Journal in May 2006, which reported on the apparent backdating of hundreds of millions of dollars' worth of stock options by UnitedHealth Group's management.  The backdating allegedly occurred with the knowledge and approval of the directors, including Kean, who sat on the company's compensation committee during three crucial years, according to the Journal. Major shareholders have filed lawsuits accusing Kean and the other directors of failing in their fiduciary duty.

Awards
Kean holds more than 30 honorary degrees, and numerous awards from environmental and educational organizations. In addition to those noted above, these include,
 The Four Freedoms Award
 The NAACP Man of the Year Award
 The Senator John Heinz Award for Public Service
 The Global Interdependence Center's Frederick Heldring Global Leadership Award
 The Voice of September 11 Building Bridges Award
 The National Wildlife Federation's Conservation Achievement Award
 The Christopher Reeve Foundation's Visionary Leadership Award
 Jefferson Award for Public Service (American Institute for Public Service)
 The Arthur W. Page Center's Larry Foster Award for Integrity in Public Communication 
 Inducted into the New Jersey Hall of Fame in 2013
New York Waterways named the ferry Governor Thomas Kean in Kean's honor.  On January 15, 2009, the ferry saved two dozen individuals, when flight 1549 made an emergency landing on the Hudson River.

Personal life
Kean met his future wife, Deborah Bye, at a party in Manhattan. They began dating in October 1966 and married on June 3, 1967. The couple had three children: daughter, Alexandra, and twin sons, Tom and Reed. Debby Kean died on April 24, 2020, at the age of 76 after 53 years of marriage.

Kean resides in Bedminster, New Jersey. Kean's son, Tom, Jr., is a New Jersey State Senator and Minority Leader of the New Jersey Senate, representing New Jersey's 21st district. Kean Jr. was the Republican Senatorial nominee in the November 2006 general election, losing to Democrat Bob Menendez. The race was expected to be close, but Menendez won by a 9-point margin.

From 1995 until 2018, Kean was a weekly columnist for The Star-Ledger, a Newark, New Jersey newspaper, where he and former New Jersey Governor Brendan Byrne (his immediate predecessor as New Jersey Governor) addressed issues of the day in a column titled "Kean-Byrne Dialogue".  Although the two sometimes disagreed (as Kean is a Republican, while Byrne was a Democrat), they occasionally saw eye to eye on topics, and both men expressed great mutual respect for each other. Kean is an advisor to, and has been inducted into, Alpha Phi Omega, a national service fraternity. Kean is a partner in Quad Partners, a private equity firm that invests in the education industry.
 On November 19, 2007, Kean endorsed John McCain for the 2008 presidential race.

Kean University

Kean University of New Jersey in Union Township, Union County, New Jersey is named after the Kean political dynasty. In 1958, the school, then named Newark State College, moved from Newark, New Jersey to the Kean family estate in Union Township. The university is located at the ancestral home of the Kean and William Livingston families at Liberty Hall (New Jersey), a National Historic Landmark on the Liberty Hall Campus of Kean University. In 1973, Newark State was renamed Kean College of New Jersey, in honor of the Kean family, and the school attained university status in 1997. The Keans maintain close ties with Liberty Hall and Kean University.

References

External links

 Thomas H. Kean biography at 9/11 Commission Official Web Site.
 New Jersey Governor Thomas H. Kean biography , National Governors Association.
  Governor Tom Kean, a biography by Alvin S. Felzenberg, Rutgers University Press.
 
 "A View from Outside the Beltway: Winning Policy Themes for the 1990s", by Thomas Kean, Heritage Lecture No. 357, The Heritage Foundation, December 15, 1991.
 "9/11 Panel Suspected Deception by Pentagon", The Washington Post, August 2, 2006.
 "Stonewalled by the C.I.A.", op-ed by Kean and Lee H. Hamilton, The New York Times, January 2, 2008.
 .
 The Thomas H. Kean Archive, Rutgers Program on the Governor

|-

1935 births
20th-century American politicians
9/11 Commission
American Episcopalians
Episcopalians from New Jersey
Republican Party governors of New Jersey
Thomas
Living people
Thomas Kean
People from Bedminster, New Jersey
People from Livingston, New Jersey
Presidents of Drew University
Princeton University alumni
Thomas Kean
Speakers of the New Jersey General Assembly
Republican Party members of the New Jersey General Assembly
St. Mark's School (Massachusetts) alumni
Thomas Kean
Teachers College, Columbia University alumni
Winthrop family